Genevieve Southerland (died June 30, 1953) was an American painter. She was a member of the Dixie Art Colony, and she established the Coden Art Colony in 1950. She was the vice president of the Alabama Art League and the Water Color Society of Alabama. Her work can be found in the permanent collection of the Montgomery Museum of Fine Arts.

References

1953 deaths
People from Mobile, Alabama
American watercolorists
American women painters
Painters from Alabama
Women watercolorists
20th-century American painters
20th-century American women artists